is a deceased Japanese professional shogi player who achieved the rank of 9-dan.He won the first Kiō title in 1976, and also served as senior managing director of the Japan Shogi Association from 1993 to 1999. He was awarded the Japanese government's Order of the Rising Sun in 2015.

Early life and education
Ōuchi was born on October 2, 1941, in Minato, Tokyo.

In 1954, he entered the Japan Shogi Association's apprentice school at the rank of 6-kyū under guidance of shogi professional Ichitarō Doi. He was promoted to the rank of apprentice professional 1-dan in 1958, and obtained professional status and the rank of 4-dan in April 1963.

Ōuchi was the first graduate of Chuo University to become a professional shogi player.

Professional shogi
Ōuchi was the challenger for the Meijin title in 1975 against Makoto Nakahara. He retired from professional shogi in April 2010.

Promotion history
The promotion history for Ōuchi is as follows:
1954: 6-kyū
1958: 1-dan
1963, April 1: 4-dan
1964, April 1: 5-Dan
1965, April 1: 6-dan
1970, April 1: 7-dan
1972, April 1: 8-dan
1984, April 1: 9-dan 
2010, April 20: Retired

Titles and other championships
Ōuchi appeared in major title matches a total of four times and won one major title. He won the Kiō title in 1976 for his only major title. In addition to his one major title, Ōuchi won eight other shogi championships during his career.

Non-title championships

Note: Tournaments marked with an asterisk (*) are no longer held.

Awards and honors
Ōuchi received a number of awards and honors throughout his career for his accomplishments both on an off the shogi board.

In November 2015, Ōuchi became the 25th professional shogi player to be awarded the Order of the Rising Sun for his contributions to the promotion of Japanese culture.

Annual Shogi Awards
2nd Annual Awards (April 1974March 1975): Most Consecutive Games Won, Distinguished Service Award
3rd Annual Awards (April 1975March 1976): Fighting-spirit Award
5th Annual Awards (April 1977March 1978): Most Consecutive Games Won
14th Annual Awards (April 1986March 1987): Special Award
36th Annual Awards (April 2008March 2009): Tokyo Shogi Press Club Award
45th Annual Awards (April 2017March 2018): Masuda Special Prize (for numerous contributions made to the Bear-in-the-hole castle in Ranging Rook openings)

Other awards
1982: Sankei Children's Book Award
1987: Shogi Honor Award (Awarded by the JSA in recognition of winning 600 official games as a professional)
1987: 25 Years Service Award (Awarded by the JSA in recognition of being an active professional for twenty-five years)
2000: Shogi Honor Fighting-spirit Award (Awarded by JSA in recognition of winning 800 official games as a professional)
2002: 40 Years Service Award (Awarded by the JSA in recognition of being an active professional for forty years)
2015: Order of the Rising Sun

Death
Ōuchi died on June 23, 2017, at age 75. The cause of death was not made public. The service was attended by roughly 500 people, including relatives, friends and fans.

References

External links
ShogiHub: Professional Player Info · Ouchi, Nobuyuki

Japanese shogi players
Deceased professional shogi players
Professional shogi players from Tokyo
Chuo University alumni
Recipients of the Order of the Rising Sun
Kiō
1941 births
2017 deaths
People from Minato